Isabella of Castile, Duchess of York (1355 – 23 December 1392) was the daughter of King Peter and his mistress María de Padilla (d. 1361). She accompanied her elder sister, Constance, to England after Constance's marriage to John of Gaunt, 1st Duke of Lancaster, and married Gaunt's younger brother, Edmund of Langley, 1st Duke of York.

Life
Isabella was the youngest of the three daughters of King Peter of Castile by his favourite mistress, María de Padilla (d.1361).

On 21 September 1371 Edward III's fourth son, John of Gaunt, 1st Duke of Lancaster, married Isabella's elder sister, Constance (d. 1394), who after the death of their father in 1369 claimed the throne of Castile. Isabella accompanied her sister to England, and on 11 July 1372, at about the age of 17, married John of Gaunt's younger brother, Edmund of Langley, 1st Duke of York, fifth son of King Edward III and Philippa of Hainault, at Wallingford, Oxfordshire, as part of a dynastic alliance in furtherance of the Plantagenet claim to the crown of Castile. According to Pugh, Isabella and Edmund of Langley were 'an ill-matched pair'.

As a result of her indiscretions, including an affair with King Richard II's half-brother, John Holland, 1st Duke of Exeter (d. 1400), whom Pugh terms 'violent and lawless', Isabella left behind a tarnished reputation, her loose morals being noted by the chronicler Thomas Walsingham. According to Pugh, the possibility that Holland was the father of Isabella's favourite son, Richard of Conisburgh, 3rd Earl of Cambridge, 'cannot be ignored'.

In her will Isabel named King Richard as her heir, requesting him to grant her younger son, Richard, an annuity of 500 marks. The King complied. However, further largesse which might have been expected when Richard came of age was not to be, as King Richard II was deposed in 1399, and according to Harriss, Isabella's younger son, Richard, 'received no favours from the new King, Henry IV'.

Isabella died 23 December 1392, aged about 37, and was buried 14 January 1393 at the church of the Dominicans at Kings Langley. After Isabella's death, Edmund of Langley married Joan Holland, sister and co-heir of Edmund Holland, 4th Earl of Kent (9 January 1382 – 15 September 1408), with whom his daughter, Constance, had lived as his mistress (see above).

Isabella was appointed a Lady of the Garter in 1379.

Issue

Isabella and Edmund of Langley, 1st Duke of York, had three children:

Edward of Norwich, 2nd Duke of York (c. 1373 – 25 October 1415), who married firstly, Beatrice of Portugal, which marriage was annulled, and secondly, Philippa Mohun, third daughter of John Mohun, 2nd Lord Mohun (c. 1320 – 15 September 1375), and Joan Burghersh (d. 4 October 1404), daughter of Bartholomew de Burghersh (c. 1304 – 3 August 1355), 3rd Baron Burghersh. Edward served in numerous administrative offices and military campaigns during the reigns of Richard II, Henry IV and Henry V, and was slain at the Battle of Agincourt on 25 October 1415.
Constance of York (c. 1374 – 28 November 1416), who married Thomas le Despenser, 1st Earl of Gloucester (22 September 1373 – 16 January 1400), third but first surviving son of Edward le Despenser and Elizabeth Burghersh, by whom she had a son, Richard, and two daughters, Elizabeth and Isabel. Constance was involved in a plot to abduct the young Edmund Mortimer, 5th Earl of March, in February 1405, and in turn implicated her elder brother, Edward. After the death of her husband she was either betrothed to or lived as the mistress of Edmund Holland, 4th Earl of Kent (9 January 1382 – 15 September 1408), and had a daughter by him, Eleanor Holland (died c. 1459), who married James Tuchet, 5th Baron Audley.
Richard of Conisburgh, 3rd Earl of Cambridge (1385 – 5 August 1415), who married Anne Mortimer, and was beheaded on 5 August 1415 for his role in the Southampton Plot.

Shakespeare and Isabella of Castile
Isabella is depicted, ahistorically, as living in late December 1399 at the time of the Epiphany Rising in Act V of Shakespeare's Richard II.

Footnotes

References

 

 
 

, 9781446449110.
: Dictionary of National Biography, 1885–1900, Volume 45

External links
For the tombs of Edmund of Langley and Isabella of Castile, see 'Friaries: King's Langley priory', A History of the County of Hertford: Volume 4 (1971), pp. 446–451. Date accessed: 21 October 2012
 https://www.ancestry.com.au/mediaui-viewer/collection/1030/tree/46888042/person/122086772445/media/bf41d2f6-1b54-4644-b907-b881fa4ef1f4?_phsrc=Cxo2368

Further reading
Reston, James, Dogs of God, New York: Doubleday, 2005.

1355 births
1392 deaths
House of York
Castilian House of Burgundy
Ladies of the Garter
14th-century Castilians
14th-century Spanish women
Duchesses of York
Castilian infantas
14th-century English people
14th-century English women
Daughters of kings